Alexandra Audrey Brettle (1937–2003), was a Black Country author of Scottish descent.

Biography
Educated at Halesowen Grammar School, she became a Salvation Army officer; before working for North Warwickshire Borough Council until her retirement.

In retirement, she began to write actively, and was a founder of the North Warwickshire Writers Group. After her death in 2003, her ashes were interred in Greenhaven Woodland Burial Ground. A collection of her writings was published posthumously, under the title The Clydebank Whistle.

References

1937 births
2003 deaths
English people of Scottish descent
People from Rowley Regis
Brettle Audrey
English Salvationists
20th-century English women writers
20th-century English writers
21st-century English women writers
20th-century Methodists
21st-century English writers